Chris Said (born July 10, 1970) is a Nationalist Party politician from Malta.

Personal life
Said was born in Nadur, Gozo. He is a lawyer by profession, having graduated with a Doctor of Laws from the University of Malta.

Said is married to Linda, née Attard, and has three children: Anastasia, Andrea, and Benjamin.

Politics
He was a mayor of his home town, Nadur. His brothers Charles and Edward have also occupied the position.

Following the 2008 Maltese general election, he was appointed as Parliamentary Secretary for Public Dialogue and Information in the Office of the Prime Minister by Lawrence Gonzi.

Chris Said resigned from his post after there were accusations of perjury on September 23, 2010. Around a month later, on October 29, 2010, his name was cleared from accusations.

Further to resignation of Carm Mifsud Bonnici, Said was appointed Minister for Justice, Dialogue and the Family on January 6, 2012.

On June 6, 2013, he was appointed Secretary General of the Nationalist Party. He did not recontest the post in June 2015, at Simon Busuttil's request, in order to focus on Gozo for the upcoming election.

After the party's defeat in the 2017 Maltese general election Chris Said ran for Leadership. Chris said came runner-up while Adrian Delia was confirmed Leader of the Nationalist Party. Said conceded the defeat by congratulating Delia and stressing the need to unite the party.

On February 3, 2018, Delia requested Said to shadow the Gozo and Constitutional Reforms portfolios.

Further to the crisis within the party regarding Simon Busuttil's position further to the conclusions of the magisterial inquiry over the ownership of Egrant, Chris Said offered to mediate between the Busuttil and Adrian Delia, claiming that there should be strength in unity against corruption.

References

Living people
1970 births
Members of the House of Representatives of Malta
Nationalist Party (Malta) politicians
People from Gozo
21st-century Maltese politicians
Government ministers of Malta